The Plastic Age (1924) is a novel by Percy Marks that tells the story of Hugh Carver, a student at a fictional men's college called Sanford. With contents that covered or implied hazing, smoking, drinking, partying, and "petting," the book sold well enough to be the second best-selling novel of 1924. The book was, however, banned in Boston.  The following year, it was adapted into a film of the same name, starring Clara Bow.

Marks was an English instructor at Brown University at the time of publication. Previously he taught at Dartmouth College and Massachusetts Institute of Technology. Brown's administration took offense at the book, which they perceived to be a barely disguised version of Brown, and Marks's teaching contract was not renewed. The Plastic Age provides a composite image of 1920s campus life with many references to campus traditions at Dartmouth and Brown including bonfires, beanies, and fraternity rushing. The novel is notable for its depiction of students attending a film, a lightly fictionalized representation of the Nugget Theater in Hanover, NH which had opened in 1916. Marks and his book remained popular on college campuses for several years after the book's publication. Students—including humorist S. J. Perelman—protested his release and a satire of the book, titled, "The Plastered Age," by E.Z. Mark, was produced on campus; but to no avail. Marks left academia for many years and devoted his time to writing books.

In 1928, under the title Red Lips, the novel was again adapted into a film. This remake starred Charles "Buddy" Rogers, who had just co-starred with Clara Bow in a different film, Wings, the previous year.

The Plastic Age was reprinted in 1980, in a series subtitled "Lost American Fiction," from Southern Illinois University Press and continues to be available in book form from other sources.

Characters 
Hugh Carver—protagonist, lives in Merrytown, undergraduate at Haydensville's Sanford College, runner, musician, aspiring writer; described as slender, young-looking, with light-brown hair
Helen Simpson—lives in Merrytown, girlfriend to Hugh, moves away to attend secretarial school
Janet (Harton) Moffitt—lives at Corley Lake, girlfriend to Hugh (briefly)
Cynthia Day—lives in Long Island, girlfriend to Hugh, described as running with a "fast crowd" though not explicitly described as a "flapper"
Carl Peters—undergraduate, roommate to Hugh, forced to leave Sanford after contracting an STD in Hastings
Norville "Norry" Parker—undergraduate, friend of Cynthia and Hugh, Irish Catholic, lives on Long Island Sound, described as slender, quietly affluent, summer host to Hugh
Malcolm Graham—undergraduate, president of Delta Sigma Deltas, attempted mentor to Hugh
Einstein—undergraduate, friend of Hugh, Jewish
Merle Douglas, Bob Tucker, Leonard Gates, John "Jack" Lawrence—undergraduates, Nu Delta presidents
Jim "Mac" McCarty—proprietor of the Haydensville billiard parlor
Hester Sheville—(inebriated) guest at Nu Delta dance
Jim Pearson—undergraduate, drives Hugh and Carl to Hastings bootlegger
Paul Vinton—undergraduate, roommate to Hugh, regularly plies Hugh with liquor 
Bessie Haines, Emma Gleeson—Hastings prostitutes
Ted Allen—undergraduate, gambling proprietor (poker and craps), card shark, hustler, presumed cheat
Harry King—undergraduate, weapon-owner
President Culver—Sanford College President
Professor Jimmie Henley—Sanford College English Professor, mentor to Hugh
Professor Hartley—Sanford College History Professor
Mr. Alling—Sanford College Latin Instructor
Professor Kane—Sanford College Mathematics Professor, academic advisor to Hugh
Professor Blake—Sanford College Professor
"Doc" Conners—Sanford College Physician
Jack Price—Sanford College Football Coach
Harry Slade—undergraduate, captain of the football team, half-back
Sherman Walford—undergraduate, captain of the football team
Herbert Morse—undergraduate, described as noble-looking, removed from the football team, withdrew due to home-sickness
Wayne Gifford—undergraduate, cheerleader
Clem Morton, Hubert Manning, Jack Collings, Jim Hicks, Harry Smithson, Chubby Elson, Donald Ferguson, Ferdy Hillman, Freddy Dickson, Freddy Fowler, George Winsor, Gordon Ross, Jim Saunders, Keith Nutter, Larry Stillwell, Melville Burbank, Merton Billings, Puddy McCumber, Pudge Jamieson—undergraduates

References

External links
 
 The Plastic Age full text at Project Gutenberg
 The Plastic Age audio book, narrated by Scott Cluthe, published by Spoken Realms.
 

1924 American novels
American novels adapted into films